Petre Ştefănucă (14 November 1906 in Ialoveni – 12 July 1942) was a Bessarabian sociologist.

Biography 
Petre Ştefănucă was born in Ialoveni on 14 November 1906. He died on 12 July 1942 in the Tatar Autonomous Soviet Socialist Republic.

Works 
  "Folclor din judetul Lapuşna",
  "Literatura populară a satului Iurceni",
  "Cercetări folclorice pe valea Nistrului-de-Jos",
  "Două variante basarabene la basmul Harap-Alb al lui Ion Creangă",
  "Datinele de Crăciun şi Anul nou pe valea Nistrului-de-Jos",
  "Amintiri din războiul mondial (Adunate de la soldaţii moldoveni din comuna Cornova, judeţul Orhei)" şi altele.

Bibliography 
  Petre Ştefănucă, "Folclor şi tradiţii populare". Alcătuire, studiu introductiv, bibliografie, comentarii şi note de Grigore Botezatu şi Andrei Hîncu.

References

External links 
  Articolul "Iată cum am pierdut un savant de mare cultură" de Sanda Golopenţia
  Site-ul Bibliotecii orăşeneşti Petre Ştefănucă din Ialoveni
  Articol în care este menţionată contribuţia profesorului Petre Ştefănucă 

1906 births
Romanian people of Moldovan descent
1942 deaths
Moldovan activists
Romanian sociologists
Romanian folklorists
Moldovan anti-communists
20th-century Moldovan historians
Foreign Gulag detainees
People who died in the Gulag